Fight and Smile (相信希望fight & smile賑災募款晚會) was a fund raising campaign held in Taiwan for the victims of the Japan 2011 Tōhoku earthquake and tsunami.  The event was held from March 17 to March 18, 2011.  About NT$788 million were raised by the event. The event was hosted by Jacky Wu, Chang Fei (張菲), Chang Hsiao-yen (張小燕) and Patty Hou.

Participants
About 300 celebrities participated in the event, including:

See also
 Artistes 311 Love Beyond Borders

References

 相信希望募款晚會

2011 in Taiwan
2011 Tōhoku earthquake and tsunami relief
Charity events